Bajina Ramprasad (27 August 1940 – 30 March 2016) was an Indian cricketer. He played 59 first-class matches for Andhra between 1959 and 1977.

References

External links
 

1940 births
2016 deaths
Indian cricketers
Andhra cricketers
People from Nellore